The November 2009 San Francisco general elections were held on November 3, 2009, in San Francisco, California. The elections included those for San Francisco city attorney and treasurer, and five ballot measures.

City attorney 
Two-term incumbent Dennis Herrera won reelection unopposed.

Treasurer 
One-term incumbent José Cisneros, who was initially appointed by Mayor Gavin Newsom in September 2004, won reelection unopposed.

Propositions 

Note: "City" refers to the San Francisco municipal government.

Proposition A 

Proposition A would change the budget cycle from a one-year system to a two-year system, require the city to adopt and prepare a five-year financial plan and long-range policies, and change deadlines for submitting and adopting labor agreements.

Proposition B 

Proposition B would allow members of the San Francisco Board of Supervisors to hire more than two aides.

Proposition C 

Proposition C would allow the city to enter into a new naming rights contract for Candlestick Park and devote half of the proceeds to City recreation center directors.

Proposition D 

Proposition D would create a Mid-Market Special Sign District, permitting new general advertising signs with some restrictions.

Proposition E 

Proposition E would prohibit new general advertising signs on street furniture and City-owned buildings.

External links
 San Francisco Department of Elections

San Francisco
2009
Elections
San Francisco